Mihaela Zavolan is a system biologist and Professor at the Biozentrum of the University of Basel.

Life
Mihaela Zavolan studied medicine at the University of Medicine and Pharmacy in Timișoara, Romania. She then graduated with a PhD in Computer Science from the University of New Mexico in Albuquerque, USA. Between 1993 and 2003 Mihaela Zavolan carried out research in the US, at the Santa Fe Institute in Santa Fe, the Los Alamos National Laboratory in Los Alamos, as well as at the Rockefeller University in New York. In 2003, Mihaela Zavolan was appointed Professor of Computational and Systems Biology at the Biozentrum of the University of Basel. She is also a group leader of the Swiss Institute of Bioinformatics (SIB).

Work
The main focus of the research in Mihaela Zavolan's group is of microRNAs (miRNAs). These 22 nucleotides long RNA molecules regulate the expression of protein coding genes, thereby controlling cell differentiation, metabolism and immune responses.
Through the development of high-throughput experimental methods and  computational analyses, Zavolan has contributed to the discovery of many miRNAs in various organisms ranging from viruses to humans. She has developed algorithms to predict miRNA genes and miRNA targets, and has worked on the development of the CLIP method (cross-linking and immunoprecipitation) for mapping the binding sites of RNA-binding proteins in RNAs. Recently, her group used CLIP binding site data to infer a biophysical model of miRNA-target interaction, which can be used to predict the strength between of interactions between miRNAs and their targets on mRNAs and long non-coding RNA.

Awards and honors 
2012 ERC Starting Grant
2014 elected Member of the Academia Europaea

References

External links

Video link
Video: Prof. Dr. Mihaela Zavolan – Computational Biology cccs.unibas.ch. Retrieved 2020-12-21

Living people
University of New Mexico alumni
Rockefeller University alumni
Academic staff of the University of Basel
University of Basel alumni
Biozentrum University of Basel
Year of birth missing (living people)
Santa Fe Institute people
Romanian expatriates in Switzerland
Romanian expatriates in the United States